Gila River Memorial Airport  was a private-use airport owned and operated by the Gila River Indian Community, located  southwest of the central business district of  Chandler, in Maricopa County, Arizona, United States. It was used for cropdusting and air charter operations, with no scheduled commercial services.

History
Gila River Memorial Airport was built in 1942 as Williams Auxiliary Army Airfield #5, one of several satellite airfields for Williams Army Airfield. After the war, it was renamed Goodyear Air Force Auxiliary Airfield, with its original triangular configuration modified to accommodate early jet aircraft of the 1950s.  During the 1960s, it passed on to civilian control as Goodyear Airport, then as Memorial Airfield. No hangar space existed at the airport until the late 1970s, when the airport began playing host to older piston-engined transport aircraft, many of which had been converted for use as air tankers. The majority of the converted aircraft were operated by Biegert Aviation. By the 1990s, it had become an aircraft boneyard.

By 2007, the Gila River Indian Community had assumed control of the airfield, renaming it Gila River Memorial Airport, and all commercial tenants were evicted from the property in the hopes of turning the airfield into a casino. In 2008, numerous aircraft were still present, including C-54s, DC-4s, DC-7s, PV-2s, and a Howard 500. Many of them have since been removed, with some of the old airport outbuildings dismantled, with further plans to expand and develop the airport still in progress.

Facilities and aircraft

Facilities

 03/21 is 
 12/30 is 

The last recorded aircraft operations were for the 12-month period ending November 16th, 1983. These statistics show that the airport had about 25,550 aircraft operations, an average of 70 per day. These statistics show that the traffic was made up of 98% general aviation aircraft and 2% military aircraft.

Aircraft
61 aircraft were based at this airport: 31 single-engine and 30 multi-engine. Most of the aircraft have been sold for scrap and the remaining eight are totally dismantled.

Images
The following images are of the current state of the airport and aircraft.

References

External links

 34AZ at Abandoned & Little-Known Airfields
 
 Pictures of the airport, circa 2011, on Flickr

Airports in Maricopa County, Arizona
Gila River Indian Community